Coregonus albellus, also called the autumn brienzlig, is a species of whitefish belonging to the family Salmonidae. It is endemic to Lakes Thun and Brienz in Switzerland's Interlaken region, where it is pelagic in deep water.

References
 
 

albellus
Endemic fauna of Switzerland
Fish described in 1890